A Place of Your Own was a Canadian
television series which aired on CBC Television from 1968 to 1971.

Premise
This series was an afternoon repackaging of series which previously aired on the morning-based Canadian School Telecasts.

Scheduling
This half-hour time block aired Wednesdays at 4:30 p.m. (Eastern) in the 1968-1969 season, moving to Mondays at 4:30 p.m. the following year. It returned to Wednesdays in 1970, from 30 September to 30 December. A final run of the series was broadcast Saturdays at 1:00 p.m. from 3 July to 25 September 1971.

References

External links
 

CBC Television original programming
1968 Canadian television series debuts
1971 Canadian television series endings